The 1968–69 Scottish Second Division was won by Motherwell who, along with second placed Ayr United, were promoted to the First Division. Stenhousemuir finished bottom.

Table

References 

 Scottish Football Archive

Scottish Division Two seasons
2
Scot